The 2015–16 season of the División de Honor de Waterpolo was the 93rd season of top-tier water polo in Spain since its inception in 1925. Twelve teams competed for this season.

The season comprises regular season and championship playoff. The regular season started in October 2015 and finished on April 23, 2016. Top eight teams at standings when finishing regular season play the championship playoff.

The championship playoff started on 3/4 May with the quarter finals series. Quarter finals, semifinals and Final are played to the best of 3 matches.

Atlètic-Barceloneta won its eleventh title in a row and sixteenth overall after defeating AstralPool Sabadell in the Championship Final series 2–1.

Competition

Format
The División de Honor season took place between October and May, with every team playing each other at home and away for a total of 22 matches. Points were awarded according to the following:
3 points for a win
1 point for a draw

Top eight teams when finishing regular season play championship playoff. Bottom team is relegated while team qualified 11th play relegation playoff.

Promotion and relegation
Bottom team at standings when finishing regular season is relegated to Primera División, while the champion team from Primera División is promoted.

Team information

Regular season standings

Championship playoffs

Bracket

Quarter-finals

1st match

2nd match

3rd match

Semifinals

1st match

2nd match

3rd match

Final

1st match

2nd match

3rd match

 Atlètic-Barceloneta wins championship Final series 2–1.

Individual awards
 Championship MVP:  Alberto Munarriz, CN Atlètic-Barceloneta
 Best Goalkeeper:  Daniel López, CN Atlètic-Barceloneta
 Top goalscorer:  Robin Lindhout, CN Mataró

Relegation playoff
Playoff to be played in two legs. 1st leg to be played on 7 May and 2nd leg on 14 May. The overall winner will play in División de Honor 2016–17 and the loser will play in Primera Nacional.

|}

1st leg

2nd leg

 CN Rubí won 23–18 on aggregate and remained in División de Honor 2016–17.

Season statistics

Top goalscorers

Number of teams by autonomous communities

References

See also
 2015–16 División de Honor Femenina de Waterpolo

External links
 Real Federación Española de Natación 

División de Honor de Waterpolo
Seasons in Spanish water polo competitions
Spain
2015 in Spanish sport
2016 in Spanish sport
2015 in water polo
2016 in water polo